Nisga'a Memorial Lava Bed Provincial Park is a provincial park in the Nass River valley in northwestern British Columbia, Canada, about 80 kilometres north of Terrace, and near the Nisga'a Villages of Gitlakdamix and Gitwinksihlkw.

The park was established by Order in Council on April 29, 1992, expanded in 1995, included in the Nisga'a Treaty in 2000, and is the first park in the province to be jointly managed by the government and a First Nation. An interpretive centre in a traditional Nisga'a longhouse informs visitors about the Nisga'a legend that accounts for the lava as well as geological causes.

The park has waterfalls, pools, cinder cones, tree moulds, lava tubes, spatter cones, a lava-dammed lake, caves and other features created by lava flows. The park aims to protect moose, goats, marmots, bears and many other species of wildlife.

The park covers 178.93 square kilometres in area.

Volcanic eruption
It is believed to be the site of Canada's most recent volcanic eruption and lava flow, a geological disaster that killed an estimated 2,000 people.

The source of the eruption was the Tseax Cone. Large lava flows dammed the Nass River and destroyed two villages of the Nisga'a people around the year 1700. Lava beds rise as much as 12 metres above the modern road.

Nisga'a oral histories record the names of the two villages destroyed in the eruption, Wii Lax K'abit and Lax Ksiluux.

See also
 Volcanology of Canada

See also
Nisga'a Lisims

References

External links

 Nisga'a Memorial Lava Bed Provincial Park - BC Parks site
 
 Nisga'a Lisims - park website

Provincial parks of British Columbia
Volcanism of British Columbia
Natural disasters in British Columbia
Nisga'a
Nass Country
Lava fields
1992 establishments in British Columbia
Protected areas established in 1992